Andrzej Krzesiński (born 1 October 1927) is a Polish athlete. He competed in the men's pole vault at the 1960 Summer Olympics.

References

1927 births
Living people
Athletes (track and field) at the 1960 Summer Olympics
Polish male pole vaulters
Olympic athletes of Poland
Place of birth missing (living people)
Skra Warszawa athletes
Polish athletics coaches